Berlin's edema (commotio retinae) a common condition caused by blunt injury to the eye.  It is characterized by decreased vision in the injured eye a few hours after the injury. Under examination the retina appears opaque and white in colour in the periphery but the blood vessels are normally seen along with "cherry red spot" in the foveal region. This whitening is indicative of cell damage, which occurs in the retinal pigment epithelium and outer segment layer of photoreceptors. Damage to the outer segment often results in photoreceptor death through uncertain mechanisms. Usually there is no leakage of fluid and therefore it is not considered a true edema. The choroidal fluorescence in fluorescent angiography is absent. Visual acuity ranges from 20/20 to 20/400.

The prognosis is excellent except in case of complications of choroidal rupture, hemorrhage or pigment epithelial damage, but damage to the macula will result in poorer recovery. The outcome can be worsened in the case of retinal detachment, atrophy or hyperplasia. Visual field defects can occur. In late cases cystoid macular edema sometimes develops which can further lead to macular destruction.
Commotio retinae is usually self limiting and there is no treatment as such. It usually resolves in 3–4 weeks without any complications and sequelae.

References

Disorders of choroid and retina